The Professional Fraternity Association (PFA) is an American association of national, collegiate, professional fraternities and sororities that was formed in . Since PFA groups are discipline-specific, members join while pursuing graduate (law, medicine, etc.) degrees as well as undergraduate (business, engineering, etc.) degrees. PFA groups seek to develop their members professionally in addition to the social development commonly associated with Panhellenic fraternities. Membership requirements of the PFA are broad enough to include groups that do not recruit new members from a single professional discipline. The PFA has welcomed service and honor fraternities as members; however, Greek letter honor societies more commonly belong to the Association of College Honor Societies.

History
These groups came about due to rapid growth among all types of fraternities during the late 1920s.

Professional Panhellenic Association

On , representatives from fourteen professional fraternities for women attended an organizational meeting in Washington, D.C. During the summer a provisional constitution was ratified by the following eleven fraternities: Delta Omicron (music), Kappa Beta Pi (law), Omicron Nu (home economics), Phi Beta (music and speech), Phi Delta Pi (physical education), Phi Chi Theta (commerce), Phi Delta Delta (law), Phi Upsilon Omicron (home economics), Pi Lambda Theta (education), Sigma Sigma Sigma (education), and Theta Sigma Phi (journalism). Two additional fraternities, Sigma Alpha Iota (music) and Iota Sigma Pi (chemistry), soon ratified the constitution. Originally known as Women’s Professional Panhellenic Association until , when the revised name was adopted.

Professional Interfraternity Conference
On March 2–3, 1928, delegates from 27 professional fraternities came together in Washington, DC to organize the PIC. Jarvis Butler of Sigma Nu Phi was elected as the first president, and Stroud Jordan of Alpha Chi Sigma was elected as the first Secretary-treasurer.

Groups represented were
Accounting: Beta Alpha Psi
Advertising: Alpha Delta Sigma
Architecture: Alpha Rho Chi
Chemistry: Alpha Chi Sigma
Commerce: Alpha Kappa Psi, Delta Sigma Pi
Dentistry: Alpha Omega, Psi Omega
Education: Kappa Phi Kappa
Engineering: Kappa Eta Kappa (Electrical), Theta Tau
Forensic: Phi Delta Gamma
General: Omicron Delta Kappa
Law: Delta Theta Phi, Gamma Eta Gamma, Phi Alpha Delta, Phi Beta Gamma, Sigma Nu Phi
Medicine: Omega Upsilon Phi, Phi Beta Pi, Phi Rho Sigma, Theta Kappa Psi
Pharmacy: Kappa Psi, Phi Delta Chi
Military: Scabbard and Blade
Science: Chi Beta Phi

Professional Fraternity Association
The PFA resulted from the merger of the Professional Interfraternity Conference and the Professional Panhellenic Association in 1978. The merger itself was the result of the impact of Title IX on most fraternal groups with professional affiliations.

Chartering organizations:
 Alpha Delta Theta – Medical Technology
 Alpha Kappa Psi – Business Administration
 Alpha Rho Chi – Architecture
 Alpha Tau Delta – Nursing
 Alpha Chi Sigma – Chemistry
 Alpha Omega – Dentistry
 Delta Theta Phi – Law
 Delta Omicron – Music
 Delta Sigma Delta – Dentistry
 Delta Sigma Pi – Business Administration
 Delta Psi Kappa – Physical Education
 Zeta Phi Eta – Communication Arts and Sciences
 Kappa Beta Pi – Law
 Kappa Delta Epsilon – Education
 Kappa Epsilon – Pharmacy
 Kappa Psi – Pharmacy
 Lambda Kappa Sigma – Pharmacy
 Mu Phi Epsilon – Music
 Xi Psi Phi – Dentistry
 Rho Pi Phi – Pharmacy
 Sigma Alpha Iota – Music
 Sigma Delta Kappa – Law
 Sigma Phi Delta – Engineering
 Phi Alpha Delta – Law
 Phi Beta – Music, Speech, Drama and Dance
 Phi Beta Pi-Theta Kappa Psi – Medical
 Phi Gamma Nu – Business
 Phi Delta Epsilon – Medical
 Phi Mu Alpha Sinfonia – Music
 Phi Rho Sigma – Medicine
 Phi Chi – Medicine
 Phi Chi Theta – Business and Economics
 Psi Omega – Dentistry
 Omega Tau Sigma – Veterinary Medicine

Current members

Former members
This includes the member organizations of the two former groups (PIC, PPA) that merged to form the PFA and organizations not currently active within the PFA.

Notes
Note 1: PIC Charterer indicates participation in the  "Preparatory Conference" at the Hamilton Hotel, Washington, D.C., on March 2 and 3, 1928.
Note 2: PPA Charterer indicates ratification of the provisional constitution of the PPA by the Second Annual Conference on November 26, 1926.
Note 3: PFA Charterer indicates membership in good standing in the PPA or PIC at the time of the merger and thus by the agreement of the joint conference in October 1977, charter members.
Note 4: Membership in 1968 only included in notes if group was not a charterer for both PPA/PIC and PFA.

References

External links
Official site

 
Organizations established in 1978
Student societies in the United States
International student societies
Supraorganizations
Greek letter umbrella organizations
 
1978 establishments in the United States